Nascentes do Rio Parnaíba National Park is a national park of Brazil.

Location

The park is in the cerrado biome.
It was established on 16 July 2002, and is administered by the Chico Mendes Institute for Biodiversity Conservation.
The park lies in parts of the municipalities of Formosa do Rio Preto in Bahia, Lizarda, Mateiros and São Félix do Tocantins in Tocantins , Alto Parnaíba in Maranhão, and Barreiras do Piauí, Corrente,  Gilbués and São Gonçalo do Gurguéia in Piauí.

Conservation

Protected species in the park include the jaguar (Panthera onca), cougar (Puma concolor) and giant armadillo (Priodontes maximus).

Notes

Sources

National parks of Brazil
Protected areas of Bahia
Protected areas of Maranhão
Protected areas of Tocantins
Protected areas of Piauí
Cerrado